The 2021–22 Turkish Airlines EuroLeague was the 22nd season of the modern era of the EuroLeague, and the 12th under the title sponsorship of the Turkish Airlines. Including the competition's previous incarnation as the FIBA Europe Champions Cup, this was the 65th season of the premier basketball competition for European men's clubs. The season started on 30 September 2021. The three Russian teams were suspended because of the 2022 Russian invasion of Ukraine. As the Russian invasion of Ukraine did not cease, the records of all regular season matches against Russian teams were annulled, and team win-loss records adjusted accordingly, dramatically affecting league standings.

Anadolu Efes successfully defended last year's title after defeating Real Madrid in the championship game.

Team allocation
ALBA Berlin was awarded with a two-year wild card Turkish Airlines EuroLeague license.
Bayern Munich and LDLC ASVEL have received long-term licenses.

Distribution
The following is the access list for this season.

Qualified teams
The labels in the parentheses show how each team qualified for the place of its starting round:

Notes

Teams

Venues and locations

Managerial changes

Referees
A total of 72 Euroleague Basketball officials set to work on the 2021–22 season in EuroLeague and EuroCup:

Regular season

League table

Regulations
When more than two teams are tied, the ranking was established taking into account the victories obtained in the games played only among them. Should the tie persist among some, but not all, of the teams, the ranking of the teams still tied was determined by again taking into account the victories in the games played only among them, and repeating this same procedure until the tie is entirely resolved.
If a tie persists, the ranking was determined by the goal difference in favour and against in the games played only among the teams still tied.

Results

1Participation of Russian teams is suspended due to the 2022 Russian invasion of Ukraine, in accordance with the decision of the Euroleague Commercial Assets (ECA) Shareholders Executive Board of 28 February.

Playoffs

Playoffs series are best-of-five. The first team to win three games wins the series. A 2–2–1 format is used – teams with home-court advantage play games 1, 2, and 5 at home, while their opponents host games 3 and 4. Games 4 and 5 are only played if necessary. The four winning teams advance to the Final Four.

Series

Final Four

The Final Four, held over a single weekend, is the last phase of the season. The four remaining teams play a single knockout round on Thursday evening, with the two winners advancing to the championship game. Saturday starts with the third-place game, followed by the championship game. The 2022 EuroLeague Final Four was played at the Štark Arena in Belgrade, Serbia, on 19–21 May 2022.

Awards
All official awards of the 2021–22 EuroLeague.

EuroLeague MVP 
  Nikola Mirotić ( Barcelona)

EuroLeague Final Four MVP 
  Vasilije Micić ( Anadolu Efes)

All-EuroLeague Teams

Alphonso Ford Top Scorer Trophy
  Vasilije Micić  ( Anadolu Efes)

Best Defender
  Kyle Hines ( A|X Armani Exchange Milan)

Rising Star
  Rokas Jokubaitis ( Barcelona)

MVP of the Round

 
Regular season

Playoffs

MVP of the Month

Statistics

Individual statistics

Rating

Source: EuroLeague

Points

Source: EuroLeague

Rebounds

Source: EuroLeague

Assists

Source: EuroLeague

Blocks

Source: 
EuroLeague

Other statistics

Individual game highs

Team statistics

Attendances

See also 
2021–22 EuroCup Basketball
2021–22 Basketball Champions League
2021–22 FIBA Europe Cup

References

External links
Official website

 
EuroLeague seasons